The Office of Workers' Compensation Programs administers four major disability compensation programs which provide wage replacement benefits, medical treatment, vocational rehabilitation and other benefits to certain workers or their dependents who experience work-related injury or occupational disease.

See also
Federal Employees' Compensation Act of 1916
Title 20 of the Code of Federal Regulations
Black Lung Benefits Act of 1972
Accident Compensation Corporation － New Zealand's equivalent

References

External links
 
 Office of Workers' Compensation Programs in the Federal Register

Office of Workers
Workers' compensation